Selasih may refer to:

 a pen name for the Indonesian author Sariamin Ismail
 the Indonesian word for basil seeds